Mercury mission may refer to:

 Exploration of Mercury, a mission to the planet Mercury
 Project Mercury, a mission of the NASA Mercury program

See also
 Mission to Mercury, 1965 novel
 Mercury (disambiguation)